The Township of Alberton is a community in the Rainy River District of Northwestern Ontario, Canada. It is made up of the two geographic townships Crozier and Roddick.  The township borders Fort Frances to the east, La Vallee to the west, the unincorporated geographical township of Miscampbell to the north, and the city of International Falls (Minnesota, United States) to the south.

Government 

Alberton is governed by a town council consisting of a reeve, Michael Ford, and four councillors, Peter Spuzak, Jennifer Johnson, Dianne Glowasky and Dan DeGagne. The council meets on the second Wednesday of each month.

Alberton is located in the federal electoral district of Thunder Bay—Rainy River, represented by New Democratic Party MP John Rafferty, and in the provincial electoral district of Kenora—Rainy River, represented by former NDP leader Howard Hampton

Alberton has a twenty-member volunteer fire department, and is protected by the Ontario Provincial Police.

Demographics 

In 2016, 52% of the community was male, and 48% is female. The median age is 40.8.

Parks and recreation 

Millennium Skating Rink and Park was built in 2001 with funding from the township and the Northern Ontario Heritage Fund. The facility is maintained by volunteers of the Alberton Recreation Commission, and hosts ice sports, basketball, rollerblading and other activities. The park portion was developed in 2004, and features a pavilion with picnic tables.

Transportation 

Highway 11/71 runs east to west through the township, and the community's main business area is located along the eastern section of the highway. Highway 602 runs east to west through the southern portion of Alberton, following the Rainy River from Fort Frances to Emo. Highway 611 runs north–south through the township. The municipality maintains  of roads.

See also
 List of municipalities in Ontario
List of townships in Ontario

References

External links 

1891 establishments in Ontario
Municipalities in Rainy River District
Populated places established in 1891
Single-tier municipalities in Ontario
Township municipalities in Ontario